Michał Tomasz Staniszewski (born 16 September 1973 in Opoczno) is a Polish slalom canoeist who competed at the international level from 1990 to 2000. Competing in three Summer Olympics, he won a silver in the C2 event in Sydney in 2000.

Staniszewski also won two medals in the C2 event at the ICF Canoe Slalom World Championships with a gold in 1995 and a silver in 1999. He also has three medals from the European Championships (1 silver and 2 bronzes).

His partner in the C2 boat throughout the whole of his active career was Krzysztof Kołomański.

World Cup individual podiums

References

1973 births
Canoeists at the 1992 Summer Olympics
Canoeists at the 1996 Summer Olympics
Canoeists at the 2000 Summer Olympics
Living people
Polish male canoeists
Olympic canoeists of Poland
Olympic silver medalists for Poland
Olympic medalists in canoeing
People from Opoczno
Sportspeople from Łódź Voivodeship
Medalists at the 2000 Summer Olympics
Medalists at the ICF Canoe Slalom World Championships